Cédric Permal (born December 8, 1991 in Mauritius) is a Mauritian footballer who currently plays for AS de Vacoas-Phoenix in the Mauritian League as a defender and midfielder.

Career

Senior career
Permal started his professional career with AS de Vacoas-Phoenix after signing with them in 2011 before the 2011 season.

International career
Permal has been called up various times to represent Mauritius at the youth level. In 2011, he received his first cap for the Mauritian national team in a 2012 AFCON qualifying game against DR Congo. Later in the year, he was called up to represent Mauritius in the 2011 Indian Ocean Island Games. He appeared in one game, against Mayotte.

References

External links
 

1991 births
Living people
Mauritian footballers
Mauritius international footballers
Mauritius youth international footballers
Association football defenders
Association football midfielders
Cercle de Joachim SC players
Frankston Pines F.C. players
People from Plaines Wilhems District
Mauritius under-20 international footballers